Samuel Emerson Smith (March 12, 1788 – March 4, 1860) was an American politician from Maine. Smith served as the tenth Governor of Maine.

Early life 
Smith was born in Hollis, New Hampshire on March 12, 1788. He graduated from Harvard University in 1808. He then studied law.

Career 
Smith was admitted to the bar in 1812. Smith practiced law in Wiscasset, Maine. He served as a representative to the Massachusetts General Court in 1819. He was as a member of the Maine House of Representatives from 1820 to 1821. In 1821 he was appointed chief justice of the Circuit Court of Common Pleas of the Second District and upon the reorganization of the court system, became an associate judge of its replacement court from 1822 to 1830.

Governor of Maine 
Smith became the Governor of Maine in 1831. During his administration, the state capitol was moved from Portland to Augusta. The controversy over the northeastern boundary of the US, mainly the border between Maine and New Brunswick, continued to escalate. He left office on January 1, 1834.

Later life 
After leaving the office, Smith was reappointed to the Court of Common Pleas. He served there from 1835 to 1837. He died on March 4, 1860.

References

Sources 
 Sobel, Robert and John Raimo. Biographical Directory of the Governors of the United States, 1789-1978. Greenwood Press, 1988. 

1788 births
1860 deaths
Democratic Party governors of Maine
Harvard University alumni
People from Wiscasset, Maine
People from Hollis, New Hampshire
Maine lawyers
Maine state court judges
Democratic Party members of the Maine House of Representatives
Members of the Massachusetts House of Representatives
19th-century American politicians
19th-century American judges
19th-century American lawyers